Asura chrysomela is a moth of the family Erebidae first described by George Hampson in 1905. It is found on the Solomon Islands.

References

chrysomela
Moths of Oceania